Events in the year 2011 in Belgium.

Incumbents
Monarch: Albert II
Prime Minister: Yves Leterme (until 6 December), Elio Di Rupo (starting 6 December)

Events
January 18 - Quiz channels are removed from Flemish television after an exposé by TV programme Basta.
February 2 - Didier Reynders appointed lead negotiator in ongoing attempts to form a governing coalition
February 26 - Flemish sitcom F.C. De Kampioenen stops after 21 seasons.
May 17 - KRC Genk win the Belgian Pro League after a home draw against Standard Liège.
June 1 - Belgium breaks the world record for length of time taken to form a government.
July 4 – Jagers te Paard Battalion formed.
August 18 - The 26th edition of music festival Pukkelpop is canceled after heavy weather leaves 5 people dead and 140 wounded.
August 28 - Sebastian Vettel wins the Belgian Grand Prix.
September 16 - Finals of the 2011 IAAF Diamond League held in Memorial Van Damme stadium, Brussels
October 2 - Paul Kiprop of Kenya wins the Brussels Marathon in 2:14.51.
October 4 - Together with France and Luxembourg, Belgium saves bank and insurance company Dexia
December 6 - The leader of the Socialist Party, Elio Di Rupo, becomes Prime Minister of the newly formed Di Rupo I Government.
December 12 - A Pakistani family is convicted and sentenced in the honor killing of Sadia Sheikh. The case has been called Belgium's first honor killing trial.
December 13 - 2011 Liège attack: Nordine Amrani kills 5 people and injures 125 others in a shooting and grenade attack in Liège before killing himself.

Deaths
November 13 - Bobsam Elejiko (30), Nigerian footballer

See also
2011 in Belgian television

References

 
Belgium
Years of the 21st century in Belgium
2010s in Belgium
Belgium